Ishaaron Ishaaron Mein was a twenty-first century Indian television series. The show was created by Qissago Telefilms LLP and produced by Ishrat Ara and Zama Habib. It stars Mudit Nayar, Simran Pareenja and Debattama Saha. The story is set in the alleys of Chawri Bazar, Old Delhi. Indian Idol 10 finalist Ankush Bhardwaj lent his voice to the title track "Ek Chup Tum, Ek Chup Main". It was aired and is available on SonyLIV.

The series ended on 30 March 2020 due to the COVID-19 crisis, after 187 episodes.

Plot 
The show features Yogi, a hearing-impaired man whose spirited handling of his disability and its acceptance by his family is meant to be inspiring. Yogi sets an example by celebrating life. The story traces his coming of age journey. He falls in love, gets his heart broken and finds unexpected love.

Yogi Shrivastava lives in old Delhi along with his father Prakash, mother Kusum, grandparents Om and Geeta, brother Vivek, sister-in-law Rani, sister Khushi, Prakash's nephew Kabir and his wife Nisha. Yogi is deaf and mute. He lip reads and often understands others' words. He loves playing football but gets scolded by Prakash who continually tells him to focus on their electronic repair shop.

Vivek is a radio drama artist while Rani is a school teacher. Kabir is an investment banker. Yogi often ends up day dreaming. One day, while working in the shops he sees a girl, Gunjan Sharma, passing by. He falls in love and follows her until he collides with a girl, Dr. Parineeti Ganguly (Pari), riding a scooter outside their colony. He misses the chance to meet Gunjan, while Pari  goes away accusing him, unaware that Yogi is deaf and dumb. The next day, Yogi again sees Gunjan passing by his shop in a rickshaw. Mesmerized, he follows her until he collides with Pari's scooter yet again. Pari confronts him and asks for damages. She blackmails Yogi that if he does not give her money, she will accuse him of teasing her in public. While she is distracted talking to a man in public, Yogi quietly escapes, leaving Pari baffled.

Yogi learns that he is to marry Gunjan. Yogi and his parents visit her wealthy family. Her mother's name is Seema and her father, a government officer, Shiv Kumar Sharma, is Prakash's childhood friend. It is revealed that Gunjan lost her voice in an accident and cannot speak. Yogi and Gunjan bond. Yogi's father tells him to not meet Gunjan before marriage. One day, when Gunjan was passing by their house in a rickshaw, Yogi follows her on his cycle. Unlike before, Gunjan notices. His happiness is short-lived as he again collides with Pari. Pari gathers people so that Yogi can't escape. Yogi tries to explain her that he is deaf and dumb but she does not believe him. Gunjan tries to help him but she sees Prakash coming and quickly escapes.

Prakash intervenes in Yogi and Pari's fight. Prakash tells Pari that Yogi can't speak or hear. She takes money from Prakash for her scooter. Prakash blames Yogi . Pari is revealed to be a bubbly, modern girl and a dedicated doctor from Kolkata. She often parties with her friends and likes drinking. Because of her habit of coming late from parties, her landlord throws her things out of the house. While riding the scooty with all her luggage, she collides with Yogi's grandfather. He is injured and Pari offers to drop him home. Yogi and Prakash identify her. While she dresses Om's wound, her luggage disappears. She creates a scene. Her pleas melt Om and Geeta's heart and they accept her as a paying guest. Yogi and other family members are against the idea. Finally, Pari is given Yogi's room which is on the terrace and Yogi is shifted to the drawing room.

Yogi is terrified to see Pari working in the hospital when he secretly tries to meet Gunjan there. Pari collides with Yogi and Gunjan while walking in the corridor. Pari accuses Yogi of following her. Yogi and Pari eventually become friends when Pari offers to help Yogi meet Gunjan. Pari saves Yogi and Gunjan from embarrassing situations and helps Yogi propose to Gunjan. Slowly, Pari begins to bond with the family. One day, Pari overhears that she would have to leave when Yogi marries because Yogi and Gunjan will live in Yogi's room. Pari gets scared and convinces Gunjan to allow her to live in the Shrivastava house, who in turn convinces Yogi. Pari stays with Khushi.

On the day of the engagement, Pari accidentally wears the engagement ring for Gunjan following a hilarious set of events in which Yogi tries to chop Pari's finger, Gunjan pretends to faint, and Pari roams around wearing surgical gloves in a house full of guests. Pari and Yogi's friendship grows stronger. In between the wedding celebrations, Rani behaves strangely. Yogi overhears a conversation between Rani and Vivek in which Rani reveals that her uncle who molested her in her childhood is invited to Yogi's wedding. Yogi promises Rani that he will not let anything happen to her. Yogi's family is unaware of this and welcomes Rani's uncle.

When Yogi sees Rani's uncle going into Rani's room, he warns her. Later, Pari schools Rani's uncle for looking at her inappropriately. Rani's uncle is attracted to Khushi and tries to come close to her. He reveals that he watched her while she was changing. Rani and the women of the house beat him up and throw him out. Rani's parents are asked to leave because Rani's mother knew, but kept quiet. 

At the pre-wedding photoshoot Yogi runs and saves Gunjan from a falling chandelier. Shiv Sharma gets angry as Yogi could have shouted and saved Gunjan before, but since he can't speak, he put Gunjan's life in danger. He thinks that Yogi is not a suitable match for Gunjan and cancels the ceremony on the wedding day. Yogi is heartbroken but does not show it to cheer up the family. Pari sees him crying. The Srivastava family angrily cuts ties with the Sharmas. Yogi goes to meet Gunjan, but is stopped by an arrogant Shiv. Shiv warns Yogi several times and finally has him arrested for nearly assaulting him. When the Srivastavs hear about this, Prakash vents on Yogi and subsequently suffers a stroke. Yogi clashes with Gunjan. Rani and Khushi yell at her for what she did to Yogi and warn her to get lost. At the hospital, Prakash becomes conscious. Shiv's wife Seema goes to meet Prakash and Yogi, but is shunned by Rani, Nisha, Khushi, and Kabir.

The family later learns that Gunjan was going to marry Roshan, the son of real estate investor Pradeep Chauhan. Hearing this, Yogi is devastated. But Pari convinces him to try to stop Gunjan's engagement. Gunjan is an obedient child and gets engaged to Roshan. Heartbroken, Yogi decides to move on. Slowly, Pari and Yogi become close friends and drinking buddies. One day Yogi enters the bathroom without knocking only to find Pari inside who throws things at him and schools him in front of the family. Yogi feels guilty and visits Pari at the hospital  where he befriends Dr. Neha who is Pari's best friend. Pari feels frustrated when Neha and Yogi flirt.

Pari somehow convinces Rani and Nisha that there is no harm in drinking once in a while. Rani gets drunk and is controlled by Vivek while Yogi drags Pari to her room. Yogi threatens Pari that he will reveal this to Prakash who in turn blackmails him to reveal to Prakash that he too got drunk. Pari's bonding with the family grows. Kusum gifts Pari a dress for Diwali. Pari is happy that finally she is receiving the love which she never got from her parents.

Pari promises to help Khushi, Rani and Nisha with Diwali preparations but has to rush to the hospital to assist in an emergency surgery. She gets stuck on duty as cases keep coming up. She is shocked to learn that Gunjan suffered burns in her hand as her dupatta caught fire from a Diya and treats her.

Meanwhile, Yogi's family gets worried that Pari is too late and sends Yogi to pick her up. Pari helps Gunjan, but treats her with contempt and taunts her for her betrayal. Yogi watches Gunjan wincing in pain and contrary to Pari and Gunjan's expectations, he ignores Gunjan and takes Pari with him. At home Pari suffers a burn on her hand. Yogi carries her inside the house and renders her first aid. 

Pari learns that Yogi was studying how to tie a bandage. Pari makes fun of Yogi when asked to draft a matrimonial ad for him, but later ends up writing good things about him. On seeing Pari struggling to carry a box of research papers with her to the hospital because of her injury, Kusum asks Yogi to at least sit behind her holding the box, but seeing Yogi's lack of courtesy, she refuses the offer and her scooter collides with Yogi's bicycle. Yogi gets angry at her for being so stubborn and decides to drive her. 

Seeing Yogi and Neha having fun at the hospital, Pari asks him to leave. At the same time, a dead patient's relatives start beating up doctors and creating havoc. Pari tries to calm the situation by showing them the terms that they signed before the operation and tells them that they can't hold the doctors responsible. Pari sees Neha and the pregnant patient coming out of her cabin and runs to save them.

One of the angry relatives of the dead patient frees himself from security and pushes Pari and the pregnant women who fall on the ground. Yogi returns and saves Pari by beating the gang. Yogi and Pari hide in the operating theater. The news of the riot is on TV and the Shrivastava family gets worried for Yogi and Pari who do not answer their calls. Yogi observes that Pari's hand is severely injured and tends to it.

In the operating theater Pari realizes that someone has locked the door from outside. She begs Yogi to break open the door because she is claustrophobic. She tells him that her parents used to lock her in her room when. Yogi hugs her to calm her and seeing her worsening condition, takes her out via an AC duct. The doctors go on strike but Pari and Neha continue to treat patients with Yogi's help. 

Pari's mother sends her a suitor, but Pari drives him away telling him that she loves Yogi. Later, Yogi refuses to take Pari with him on a trip to Surajkund. Pari mistakenly reveals the trip to Prakash. Yogi and Puri get into a heated argument in which she confesses her love. Yogi is shocked but is taken away by Rani before he can react. Pari regrets confessing her feelings, but Yogi is shown looking at Pari's pictures on his phone. Pari's parents attempt to take her home but she refuses. Yogi tries to avoid Pari unless she comes to treat Nisha who fell unconscious by Yogi's side.

Yogi's behaviour remains cold and she agrees to go. When Rani and Kusum ask Yogi to gift Pari a saree, he leaves the room in anger only to collide with Pari at the door. Both fall and get hurt. Rani is irked by Yogi's extreme behaviour towards Pari and confronts him for being in love with her. She advises him to reveal his love before it is too late. After a heartfelt confession, Yogi and Pari begin to date. Rani, Vivek and Dadaji and Dado are delighted to learn about their relationship. 

Shiv Kumar Sharma gets a heart attack. When Prakash hears about it, he goes to the hospital and reconciles with Shiv. In return, Prakash promises Shiv that Yogi will marry Gunjan. Prakash asks Pari to stay away from Yogi. Heartbroken, Pari leaves the house of Shrivastav for Yogi's marriage and happiness. Yogi does not like Gunjan because he loves Pari, and still visits her. After hearing that Yogi is leaving Gunjan for Pari, Kusum asks Pari to leave Delhi, and never contact Yogi again. Yogi sees Pari again at the hospital. Yogi remembers Gunjan, and goes home. Yogi says sorry to Gunjan for his mistakes, and for his anger.

Months later, Shiv buys Yogi and Gunjan a honeymoon package to Mumbai, and both of them go there, and enjoy everything. One night Gunjan faints, and Yogi calls the hotel staff. Yogi is shocked to learn that the doctor available is Pari. The next day, Gunjan tells Yogi that she is pregnant.

The two return to Delhi.

Cast 
 Mudit Nayar as Yogesh "Yogi" Shrivastava – Prakash and Kusum's younger son; Vivek and Khushi's brother; Gunjan's husband; Pari's former love interest; Ansh's father
 Simran Pareenja as Gunjan Sharma Shrivastava – Shiv and Seema's daughter; Gautam's sister; Roshan's ex fiancé; Yogi's wife; Ansh's mother
 Debattama Saha as Dr. Parineeti "Pari" Ganguly – Yogi's former love interest; Sujoy's love interest
 Karan Godhwani as Sujoy Banerjee – Pari's love interest
 Kiran Karmarkar as Prakash Shrivastava – Om and Geeta's son; Kusum's husband; Vivek, Yogi and Khushi's father; Pihu and Ansh's grandfather
 Swati Shah as Kusum Shrivastava – Prakash's wife; Vivek, Yogi and Khushi's mother; Pihu and Ansh's grandmother
 Sudhir Pandey as Om Shrivastava – Geeta's husband; Prakash's father; Vivek, Yogi and Khushi's grandfather; Pihu and Ansh's great-grandfather
 Sulbha Arya as Geeta Shrivastava – Om's wife; Prakash's mother; Vivek, Yogi and Khushi's grandmother; Pihu and Ansh's great-grandmother
 Karaan Singh as Vivek Srivastav – Prakash and Kusum's elder son; Yogi and Khushi's brother; Rani's husband; Pihu's father
 Rishina Kandhari as Rani Shrivastava – Vivek's wife; Pihu's mother
 Sumbul Touqeer Khan as Khushi Shrivastava – Prakash and Kusum's daughter; Vivek and Yogi's sister
 Mannat Mishra as Pihu Shrivastava – Vivek and Rani's daughter
 Saraswati Vijay as Nisha – Kabir's wife
 Pradeep Duhan as Kabir – Kailash and Pushpa's son; Prakash's nephew; Nisha's husband
 Nitesh Prashar as Babloo Qureshi – Yogi's friend
 Varinder Singh as Surjeet – Yogi's friend
 Sooraj Thapar as Shiv Sharma – Seema's husband; Gunjan and Gautam's father; Prakash's childhood friend; Ansh's grandfather 
 Trishna Vivek as Seema Sharma – Shiv's wife; Gunjan and Gautam's mother; Ansh's grandmother
 Aksh Shah as Gautam Sharma – Shiv and Seema's son; Gunjan's brother
 Rajeev Kumar as Kailash – Pushpa's husband; Kabir's father
 Apoorv Chaturvedi as Roshan Chauhan – Pradeep's son; Gunjan's ex-fiancé
 Shriya Jha as Mohana Banerjee
 Nishikant Dixit as Rani's Uncle
 Pankaj Kalra as Pradeep Chauhan – Roshan's father 
 Vishwa Gulati as Anirudh – Pari's suitor
 Shravani Goswami as Mrs. Ganguly – Pari's mother.

Awards and nominations

 Mudit Nayar won ITA Award for Best Actor (Jury)

References 

Sony Entertainment Television original programming
Indian drama television series
Indian television soap operas
2019 Indian television series debuts
2020 Indian television series endings